The statue of Henry Irving is located on the grounds of the National Portrait Gallery along Charing Cross Road in London, United Kingdom. It was erected on 12 May 1910 by English actors and actresses and others related to British theatre in a campaign organized by the Irving Memorial Committee. It was installed on land donated by the City of Westminster. The Irving Society hosts a wreath-laying ceremony at the statue on 6 February each year, commemorating the actor's birth. The bronze statue and Portland stone pedestal is by the sculptor Thomas Brock and is Grade II listed.

References

External links
 
 Henry Irving - Charing Cross Road, London, UK at Waymarking.com

1910 sculptures
1910 establishments in the United Kingdom
Irving, Henry
Monuments and memorials in London
Outdoor sculptures in London
Sculptures by Thomas Brock
Irving, Henry